Securin is a protein that in humans is encoded by the PTTG1 gene.

Function 

The encoded protein is a homolog of yeast securin proteins, which prevent separins from promoting sister chromatid separation. It is an anaphase-promoting complex (APC) substrate that associates with a separin until activation of the APC. The gene product has transforming activity in vitro and tumorigenic activity in vivo, and the gene is highly expressed in various tumors. The gene product contains 2 PXXP motifs, which are required for its transforming and tumorigenic activities, as well as for its stimulation of basic fibroblast growth factor expression. It also contains a destruction box (D box) that is required for its degradation by the APC. The acidic C-terminal region of the encoded protein can act as a transactivation domain. The gene product is mainly a cytosolic protein, although it partially localizes in the nucleus.

Interactions 

PTTG1 has been shown to interact with:
 DNAJA1, 
 Ku70 
 P53,
 PTTG1IP,  and
 RPS10.

Regulation 

During Mitosis CDK1 phosphorylate PTTG1 at Ser-165. PTTG1 is down-regulated in melanoma cells in response to the cyclin-dependent kinase inhibitor PHA-848125.

References

Further reading